Kim Bryant Allen (born April 5, 1953) is a former professional baseball player.

Career
After playing college baseball for the  UC Riverside Highlanders and having a nondescript minor league career, Allen briefly earned prospect status with the Seattle Mariners on the strength of his spectacular  season for the Triple-A Spokane Indians.  That season he registered a 35-game hitting streak and stole 84 bases, the most in the Pacific Coast League since 1913. He was called up to the Mariners in September 1980 and swiped 10 bags in 23 games.

Entering , Allen was a dark horse Rookie of the Year candidate, as there was speculation that Mariners manager Maury Wills would embrace Allen's larcenous ways and would allow him to run wild.  However, after breaking camp with the Mariners, Allen was used almost exclusively as a pinch-runner, and then was sent down at the end of April.

In 1982, he hit .260/.326/.358 and stole 22 bases in 28 tries and posted .276/.340/.409 in 47 games in 1983. Surprisingly, he was caught in eight of 20 steal attempts that year.

Allen also spent 1976 in the Mexican League while playing for the Alacranes de Durango.

In between, he played winter ball with the Navegantes del Magallanes club of the Venezuelan League in the 1980-81 season, and for the Petroleros de Zulia of the extinct Inter-American League in 1979.

Sources

External links

1953 births
Living people
Alacranes de Durango players
American expatriate baseball players in Japan
American expatriate baseball players in Mexico
Baseball players from California
Columbus Clippers players
Fort Myers Sun Sox players
Hanshin Tigers players
Major League Baseball outfielders
Major League Baseball second basemen
Navegantes del Magallanes players
Nippon Professional Baseball outfielders
People from Fontana, California
Petroleros de Zulia players
Quad Cities Angels players
Rochester Red Wings players
Salinas Angels players
Salt Lake City Gulls players
San Bernardino Pride players
Seattle Mariners players
Spokane Indians players
UC Riverside Highlanders baseball players
American expatriate baseball players in Venezuela